Mikael Gath (born June 17, 1976) is a Swedish ice hockey coach and former player. He is currently coaching Odense Bulldogs in the Danish Metal Ligaen.

References

External links 

1976 births
Swedish ice hockey right wingers
Rögle BK players
Living people